Oberea delongi is a species of flat-faced longhorn beetle in the tribe Saperdini in the genus Oberea, discovered by Knull in 1928.

References

D
Beetles described in 1928